Let's Dish! is a Minneapolis-based meal-preparation company founded in 2003. The company's business model allows customers to pick up pre-packaged and pre-assembled meals that are designed to be frozen and then cooked at the time the customer needs them.

Types of Services 
Let's Dish! made the move to a retail-only service model in 2020. The company currently offers three services:
 Retail Shopping (Pre-Assembled Meals) The customer can shop online or visit a Let's Dish! store location to shop for 6-serving size or 3-serving size meals. Let's Dish! offers a menu of meals available year-round (Favorites) or seasonally. Customers can also browse through appetizers, sides, and desserts. 
 Gift Delivery The customer can place an order online for gift delivery. The company ships to Minnesota, Wisconsin, Iowa, North Dakota, and South Dakota. 
 Gift Cards The customer can buy gift cards in-store or online. Gift Cards can be redeemed at any of the 5 Let's Dish! store locations.

Stores 
Let's Dish! has stores in:
 Apple Valley, Minnesota
 Eden Prairie, Minnesota
 Maple Grove, Minnesota
 Prior Lake, Minnesota
 Woodbury, Minnesota

Meals 
Some examples of menu offerings include Family-Style Chicken Pot Pie, Barbacoa Beef Burrito Bowls, Baked Ravioli Lasagna, and Linguine Shrimp Scampi. The menu also changes seasonally (about every two months) to offer new meals, appetizers, sides and desserts.

References

External links 
 Home-Cooked Meals (Just add the Asterisk), article in NY Times about Let's Dish!
 StarTribune: Let's Dish is serving up success

Companies based in Minneapolis